The Global Counterterrorism Forum is an informal, apolitical, multilateral counter-terrorism (CT) platform that was launched officially in New York on 22 September 2011.

The GCTF's goal is to strengthen capabilities in order to develop a strategic, long-term approach to counter terrorism and prevent the violent extremist ideologies that underpin it. The GCTF's mission is to diminish terrorist recruitment and increase countries’ civilian capabilities for dealing with terrorist threats within their borders and regions.

The outcome documents of the forum are non-binding and not intended to create legal obligations for national governments.

Members 
The 30 members of the GCTF are: 

Algeria
France
Netherlands
Spain
Australia
Germany
New Zealand
Switzerland
Canada
India
Nigeria
Turkey
China
Indonesia
Pakistan
United Arab Emirates (UAE)
Colombia
Italy
Qatar
United Kingdom (UK)
Denmark
Japan
Russia
United States (US)
Egypt
Jordan
Saudi Arabia
European Union (EU)
Morocco
South Africa

Partners and outreach

Inspired institutions

GCERF

Hedayah

International Institute for Justice and the Rule of Law (IIJ)

References

External links

Counterterrorism in the United States
Counterterrorist organizations